Attanakumbura is a village in Sri Lanka. It is located within Central Province.

See also 

 List of towns in Central Province, Sri Lanka

External links 

Populated places in Nuwara Eliya District